Kazimierz Włodzimierz Szempliński (7 January 1899 – 12 February 1971) was a Polish fencer. He competed in the team épée event at the 1936 Summer Olympics.

From November 1919 he was a member of Polish Armed Forces. Szempliński fought in the Polish-Soviet War and then in the September Campaign of World War II.

References

1899 births
1971 deaths
Polish male fencers
Olympic fencers of Poland
Fencers at the 1936 Summer Olympics
Fencers from Warsaw
People from Warsaw Governorate
Polish military personnel of World War II